Sahlan railway station (Persian:ايستگاه راه آهن سهلان, Istgah-e Rah Ahan-e Sahlan) is located near Sahlan(Saghalan) East Azerbaijan Province. The station is owned by IRI Railway. The station is rural in nature, and its infrastructures and accesses are still undeveloped, and thus it virtually can't serve any population centre or point of interest.

References

External links

Railway stations in Iran